Still Life is a 2006 Chinese film directed by Jia Zhangke. Shot in the old village of Fengjie, a small town on the Yangtze River which is slowly being destroyed by the building of the Three Gorges Dam, Still Life tells the story of two people in search of their spouses. Still Life is a co-production between the Shanghai Film Studio and Xstream Pictures.

The film premiered at the 2006 Venice Film Festival and was a winner of the Golden Lion Award for Best Film. The film premiered at a handful of other film festivals, and received a limited commercial release in the United States on January 18, 2008 in New York City.

Like The World, Jia Zhangke's previous film, Still Life was accepted by Chinese authorities and was shown uncensored in both mainland China and abroad.

Plot 
Still Life is set in Fengjie, a city upstream of the massive Three Gorges Dam. Now marked for flooding, the city undergoes a process of self-deconstruction. Into this dying town comes Han Sanming, a coal-miner from the province of Shanxi who has returned in search of a wife who ran away sixteen years ago. Upon arriving, he asks a local motorcyclist to drive him to his former address on "Granite Street." The driver takes him to the river bank, revealing that his entire neighborhood has been flooded since the building of the dam. After a failed attempt to obtain his wife's information from the local municipal office, Han Sanming settles into a local hotel. Sanming's next stop is a rickety boat owned by his wife's elder brother. The brother informs Sanming that his wife and daughter (the real reason for his return) work downriver in Yichang but that if he remains in the city, they will eventually return there.

Sanming then befriends a local teen, Brother Mark, who helps him get a job with his demolition crew. Together, the two spend their days tearing down buildings.

The film then cuts to a second story with the arrival of Shen Hong, a nurse. Shen Hong's husband, Guo Bin had left their home in Shanxi two years earlier and had made only token attempts to keep in contact. She eventually enlists the help of one of her husband's friends, Wang Dongming, who lets her stay at his home as the two seek Guo Bin.  Shen Hong discovers that Guo Bin had become a fairly successful businessman in Fengjie.  Dongming refuses to answer whether Guo Bin has another girl on the side, though Shen Hong later finds out her husband is indeed having an affair with his wealthy investor. When Guo Bin and Shen Hong at last meet, she simply walks away. As her husband pursues her, she tells him that she has fallen in love with someone else and wishes to divorce. When he asks with whom and when she had fallen in love, she responds, "Does it really matter?"

The film then cuts back to Sanming for the final third. He has been working at demolishing buildings for some time when Brother Mark is fatally injured in a collapse of a wall (or perhaps he was murdered during a "job" contracted out by Guo Bin to gather a gang of youths to intimidate the inhabitants of a rival piece of real estate). Soon afterwards, his brother-in-law calls informing him that his wife, Missy Ma has returned. Sanming and Missy then meet. Sanming asks why she left him, to which she answers, "I was young, what did I know?" She tells him that their daughter works further south, and that she works for a boat-owner essentially as an indentured servant due to her brothers debt. Sanming attempts to take his ex-wife with him, but is informed that he will have to pay 30,000 RMB to cover the debt. He promises to do so, and makes the decision to head back to Shanxi to work in the mines. His new friends and coworkers announce that they will be following, but Sanming reminds them of the intensely dangerous nature of the work. The film ends as Sanming prepares to depart.

Cast 
 Han Sanming as Han Sanming, the actor plays a character named after himself. The film's Han Sanming is a coal-miner from Shanxi province who has returned to Fengjie in search of his wife and daughter, neither of whom he has seen in sixteen years. 
 Zhao Tao as Shen Hong, a nurse, also from Shanxi, who has come to Fengjie in search of her husband, who has been out of touch for two years. 
 Li Zhubing as Guo Bin, Shen Hong's husband.
 Wang Hongwei as Wang Dongming, an archaeologist working in the ruined lots in Fengjie and a friend of Guo Bin's who helps Shen Hong track him down. 
 Ma Lizhen as Missy Ma, Han Sanming's erstwhile wife.
 Zhou Lin as Brother Mark, a young laborer who befriends Han Sanming.
 Luo Mingwang as Brother Ma, Missy Ma's elder brother, and Han Sanming's brother-in-law.

Production 
Filmed on location in Fengjie, Still Life was shot entirely on high-definition digital video by cinematographer Yu Lik-wai.

Casting was primarily with Jia regulars, including the two leads Zhao Tao (who has appeared in every Jia film since 2000's Platform) and Han Sanming (who also appeared in Jia's The World). Also appearing in a minor role is actor Wang Hongwei, who often acts as Jia's on-screen alter-ego (Xiao Wu, Platform). The film's crew also consisted of frequent Jia collaborators. Most notable among these were cinematographer Yu Lik-wai (The World, Platform, Unknown Pleasures, Xiao Wu), composer Lim Giong (Useless, Dong, The World) and editor Kong Jinglei (Platform, The World).

Unlike many of his contemporaries (and indeed unlike many of Jia's own films), Still Life was approved by the Chinese Film Bureau, SARFT, and was co-produced by the state-operated Shanghai Film Studio. Jia himself suggested that this support was due to the fact that "[t]he impact of the Three Gorges project is phenomenal. It’s not something the government can cover up."

Still Life was therefore given a brief theatrical run in China (opening on the same day as the big-budget Curse of the Golden Flower) and was also heavily bootlegged.

Soundtrack  
The soundtrack, composed by the Taiwanese musician Lim Giong, is mostly electronic, with elements of Chinese folk song. Parts of the soundtrack were collected in the 2007 album Jia Zhangke Movie Music Collection 賈樟柯電影音樂作品集. In addition, several songs are sung or played during the events of the film:

 "Mice Love Rice" 老鼠愛大米 (2004), a song that gained popularity online, is sung by a boy in the boarding house at which Han Sanming stays.
 "Good People Enjoy Peaceful Lives" 好人一生平安 (1990), originally sung by Li Na, is set as Han Sanming's ringtone. 
 "Shanghai Beach" 上海灘 (1980), the Cantonese theme song to the television show The Bund originally performed by Frances Yip, is set as Brother Mark's ringtone. 
 "Two Butterflies" 兩隻蝴蝶 (2004), originally sung by Pang Long, is sung by a boy on the boat on which Shen Hong arrives. 
 "A Drenched Heart" 潮濕的心 (1994), originally sung by Gan Ping 甘萍, is played when Shen Hong and Wang Dongming visit a terrace in search for Shen Hong's husband. 
 "Any Empty Wine Bottles for Sale?" 酒矸倘賣無 (1983), the theme song to Papa, Can You Hear Me Sing originally sung by Su Rui, is sung by a performer that Han Sanming sees.

Style 
Like many of Jia's works, Still Life's pacing is stately but slow. Unlike his earlier works, notably Platform, Jia's camerawork in Still Life is constantly on the move, panning across men and vistas. Indeed, slow pans of men and landscapes marks the film's primary visual style. Shelly Kraicer notes how the slow, lingering cameras create tableaux of both bodies ("male, copiously presented, and frequently half nude") and landscapes ("long, slow, 180-degree pans that turn vast fields of rubble, waste, and half-decayed, soon-to-be demolished buildings into epic tableaux"). This visual trope has drawn references to the Italian master Michelangelo Antonioni and many of his works about urban displacement. Manohla Dargis drew a connection between Jia and Antonioni in regards to the opening shot, wherein the camera pans slowly across a long boat full of passengers; she writes, "In Still Life [Jia] uses human bodies as moving space, to borrow Michelangelo Antonioni’s peerless phrase, but with enormous tenderness." She continued: "Antonioni’s influence on Mr. Jia is pronounced, evident in the younger filmmaker’s manipulation of real time and the ways he expresses his ideas with images rather than through dialogue and narrative." David Denby of The New Yorker, meanwhile also made the Antonioni connection in reference to the film's story, wherein "Inanition and mere things have overwhelmed the human presence, as in one of Antonioni’s empty urban landscapes."

Visually, the film's use of High-Definition similarly creates unusually "crisp" imagery that draws attention to the beauty of both the natural environment and the decaying urban landscape.

The film has also drawn notice for its element of the surreal and fantastic. This ranges from subtle (the tight-rope walker near the end of the film), to the obvious, including two CGI images: one of a UFO, which serves to divide the stories of Shen Hong and Sanming, and a modernist building, which rather abruptly launches upward like a rocket. In addition Jia uses four instances of single-character title cards representing "Cigarettes." "Liquor," "Tea," and "Candy." While some critics called this usage of titles "seemingly arbitrary," Shelly Kraicer writes of the symbolic use of the characters:

Reception 
Still Life premiered in the 2006 Venice Film Festival, where it won the film festival's top prize, the Golden Lion award. With its win, the film's profile was instantly raised. Chinese press, upon seeing its success, also gave the film and its director positive coverage in the media.

The film received acclaim from critics following its limited release in the United States in early January 2008. Manohla Dargis, critic for The New York Times, noted that Jia's film "exists on a continuum with the modernist masters, among other influences, but [that] he is very much an artist of his own specific time and place." Other critics, like J. Hoberman of The Village Voice, also praised the film but noted the more political undertones, consciously drawing contrast to the Fifth Generation director Zhang Yimou and his more recent big-budget epics. Review databases like Rotten Tomatoes and Metacritic recorded equally strong reviews for the film, with a 92% favorable rating (out of 25 reviews) from the former, and an 81% (out of 10 reviews) rating from the latter as of February 2008.  At the end of 2008, Village Voice and LA Weekly'''s annual film poll of film critics placed the film as the 4th best film of the year,  and Film Comment, official journal of the Film Society of Lincoln Center's annual end of year critic' poll of 100 film critics placed Still Life as the 6th best film of the year, with a total of 521 points. The film was voted the third best film of the past decade in  a survey by the Toronto International Film Festival's Cinematheque, composed of 60 film experts from around the world.

Top ten lists
The film appeared on many critics' top ten lists of the best films of 2008.

1st - Scott Foundas, LA Weekly (tied with Fengming, a Chinese Memoir)
3rd - Ella Taylor, LA Weekly (tied with Up the Yangtze)
6th - Bill White, Seattle Post-Intelligencer6th - Joe Morgenstern, The Wall Street Journal6th - Sheri Linden, The Hollywood Reporter8th - Peter Rainer, The Christian Science Monitor9th - Manohla Dargis, The New York Times9th - Michael Phillips, Chicago TribuneStill Life was placed at 75 on Slant Magazine's list of best films of the 2000s.

Awards and nominations
 2006 Venice Film Festival
 Winner of the Golden Lion
 Official Selection 
 2006 Asian Film Awards
 Winner of Best Director, Jia Zhangke
 Best Picture (nominee)
 Best Composer, Lim Giong (nominee)
 2007 Adelaide Film Festival 
 Winner of the NATUZZI International Award for Best Feature Film
 2007 Valdivia International Film Festival
 Winner of Best International Feature Film
 Winner, Best Actor, Han Sanming
 2007 Tromsø International Film Festival
 Winner of the FIPRESCI Prize
 2007 Durban International Film Festival
 Winner of Best Direction
 2008 Los Angeles Film Critics Association Awards
 Winner: Best Foreign Language Film
 Winner: Best Cinematography (Yu Lik-wai)

See also
 Dong, Jia's documentary companion piece to Still Life'', filmed approximately at the same time.

References

External links
 
 
 
 
 
 Still Life from distributor, New Yorker Films

2006 films
Golden Lion winners
2000s Mandarin-language films
Sichuanese-language films
2006 drama films
Films set in Chongqing
Films directed by Jia Zhangke
Shanghai Film Studio films
Jin Chinese-language films
Chinese drama films